Ivor Thomas may refer to:

Ivor Thomas (sculptor) (1873–1913), British sculptor, brother of Bert Thomas
Ivor Thomas (trade unionist) (1875–1963), Welsh trade unionist and socialist activist
Sir Ivor Thomas (British Army officer) (1893–1972), British Army general
Ivor Owen Thomas (1898–1982), British trade unionist and Labour Party politician
Ivor Bulmer-Thomas (born Ivor Thomas, 1905–1993), British journalist and politician
Ivor Thomas (boxer), 19th-century Welsh boxer, see Boxing in Wales
Ivor Thomas (golfer), English golfer, winner of the Golf Illustrated Gold Vase in 1935
Ivor Thomas (rugby union), Welsh international rugby union player in 1924, see List of Wales national rugby union players